Remco Jelmer van der Schaaf (born 28 February 1979) is a Dutch former professional footballer who played as a midfielder.

Club career
Van der Schaaf was born in Ten Boer, Groningen. After playing youth football for VV Omlandia and TOP Oss, he began his professional career in 1997 at Vitesse Arnhem, where he spent part of the 1999–2000 season on loan at Fortuna Sittard.

Van der Schaaf signed for PSV Eindhoven in 2002, and was injured in a 2004 UEFA Cup match by Titus Bramble of Newcastle United. Van der Schaaf re-signed for Vitesse in 2005, and in July 2008 he signed a three-year deal with Burnley, turning down a contract from Welsh side Cardiff City in the process.

Van der Schaaf signed on loan for Danish Superliga side Brøndby IF in February 2009, where he stayed until the end of the 2008–09 season.

in January 2010, van der Schaaf once again signed on loan for Brøndby IF on a one and a half year contract, thus seeing out his contract with Burnley.

In July 2011 he joined the Danish club Randers FC on a two-year contract.

International career
Van der Schaaf has represented the Dutch under-21 side.

References

External links
 
 
 Player profile at Burnley F.C.
 Player profile at Voetbal International 
 International stats at 11v11
 Netherlands stats at OnsOranje

1979 births
Living people
People from Ten Boer
Association football midfielders
Association football central defenders
Dutch footballers
Netherlands under-21 international footballers
Netherlands youth international footballers
SBV Vitesse players
Fortuna Sittard players
PSV Eindhoven players
Burnley F.C. players
Brøndby IF players
Randers FC players
Danish Superliga players
Eredivisie players
English Football League players
Dutch expatriate footballers
Expatriate footballers in England
Expatriate men's footballers in Denmark
Dutch expatriate sportspeople in England
Dutch expatriate sportspeople in Denmark
TOP Oss players
Footballers from Groningen (province)